Agaie is a Local Government Area in Niger State, Nigeria. Its headquarters are in the town of Agaie on the A124 highway.

It has an area of 1,903 km and a population of 132,907 at the 2006 census.

The postal code of the area is 911.

History

Agaie was a 19th-century state in present-day Nigeria covering roughly the same land of the present LGA. It was originally inhabited by Nupe people, but became an emirate and part of the Fulani Empire in 1822, after Fulani mercenaries intervened in the Nupe civil wars. In the early 20th century, the land became a part of the British Empire.The Etsu nupe Agaie is Alhaji Yusuf Nuhu

References

Sokoto Caliphate
Former countries in Africa
Local Government Areas in Niger State